Bahman Amiri Moghadam (born in 1962) is an Iranian soldier and former governor of Kermanshah province in the 13th government. He was appointed as the governor of Kermanshah province on 5 January 2022 after receiving the vote of confidence from the Board of Ministers. He was born in Kermanshah.

References

1962 births
Living people
Governors of Kermanshah Province
Date of birth missing (living people)